The Andhra Pradesh Express was a Superfast South Central Railway train that used to run between Hyderabad and . It operated daily, taking around 27 hours to cover the distance while passing through the states of Andhra Pradesh (present-day Telangana), Maharashtra, Madhya Pradesh, Uttar Pradesh, Rajasthan, Haryana before reaching New Delhi.

Indian Railways had allocated the service number 12723 for the Hyderabad–New Delhi run, and service number 12724 for the New Delhi–Hyderabad run. The train service was first commissioned by Madhu Dandavate in 1976.

Change of name

After the bifurcation of Andhra Pradesh, Andhra Pradesh Express runs from Telangana and hence, the name of the train will be renamed as Telangana Express with effect from 15 November 2015. The new train between Visakhapatnam–Delhi via Vijayawada will be named as Andhra Pradesh AC Express.

See also

 Express trains in India

References

Named passenger trains of India
Railway services introduced in 1978
Rail transport in Telangana
Rail transport in Maharashtra
Rail transport in Madhya Pradesh
Rail transport in Uttar Pradesh
Rail transport in Haryana
Rail transport in Delhi
Defunct trains in India